Dhidhdhoo (Dhivehi: ދިއްދޫ) is the capital of Haa Alif Atoll  in the Maldives. Ranked the 2nd most populated place in the north after Kulhudhuffushi City. Located in the center of the atoll, Dhidhdhoo is governed by Dhidhdhoo Island Council under the Local Government Authority. This island is famous for having the least crime rates amongst the 10 most populated islands in the nation consecutively for a number of years.

Education 
Ha.Atoll Education Centre ( HA.AEC) is located in Dhidhdhoo and is the biggest educational institution in the atoll. Currently 993 students are studying here. Primary, secondary and higher secondary classes are conducted in this educational facility.

Apart from this, the island has a pre-school and the first Junior college in the nation will be located in Dhidhdhoo. The college will be open for public early next year with an accommodation block for temporary residents.

History
Historically, the island was uninhabited and was under the administration of Utheemu Gadhuvaru, a royal house in Utheemu. The island was inhabited around the 19th century when the people of Dhonakulhi left their island to escape from the invasion of pirates from Malabar.

During the administration of President Mohamed Amin Didi, Dhidhdhoo refused to take part in the 'Uthuru Gadubadu', an uprising of the people of the northern atolls against the Amin Didi regime.

Geography
The island lies on the north western tip of Thiladhunmathi Atoll and is separated from the Ihavandhippolhu Atoll by the deep Gallandhoo Kandu channel.

Demography

Governance 
Dhidhdhoo Council is the local government body responsible for the governance of the island Dhidhdhoo. The council was created in 2011, with the enactment of the Decentralization Bill, which saw the introduction of local governance to the country.

The majority of councilors, elected in the country's second local council elections in 2014, is from the PPM. The third local election was held in 2017, that elected 5 members due to an amendment to Local Councils Laws. All five members were from  Maldives Democratic Party (MDP)

Culture
People of Dhidhdhoo has strong family relation with Minicoy Island of India (Maliku). This is evident even today as there are several Maliku families in Dhidhdhoo who carry the name of Maliku as their family name.

Among the dishes, Hithi (Hichaa bai) is one of the most special dish in Dhidhdhoo and mostly served during the month of Ramazaan. Like Hithi, Bondu is also a very popular candy prepared by people of Dhidhdhoo.

References

External links
Isles Profile - Dhidhdhoo

Islands of the Maldives